Talorc son of Muircholach was a king of the Picts from 538 to 549.

The Pictish Chronicle king lists have him reign for eleven years between Cailtram and Drest V. There are many variants of his father's name, including Mordeleg, Murtholoic and Mordeleth.

References
Anderson, Alan Orr, Early Sources of Scottish History A.D 500–1286, volume 1. Reprinted with corrections. Paul Watkins, Stamford, 1990.

External links
Pictish Chronicle

549 deaths
Pictish monarchs
6th-century Scottish monarchs
Year of birth unknown